A Horseman of the Plains is a 1928 American silent Western film directed by Benjamin Stoloff and starring Tom Mix, Sally Blane and Heinie Conklin.

Cast
 Tom Mix as Tom Swift  
 Sally Blane as Dawn O'Day  
 Heinie Conklin as Snowshoe  
 Charles Byer as J. Rutherford Gates  
 Lew Harvey as Flash Evan 
 Grace Marvin as Esmeralda 
 William Ryno as Michael O'Day

References

Bibliography 
 Jensen, Richard D. The Amazing Tom Mix: The Most Famous Cowboy of the Movies. 2005.

External links 
 

1928 Western (genre) films
Films directed by Benjamin Stoloff
1928 films
American black-and-white films
Fox Film films
Silent American Western (genre) films
1920s English-language films
1920s American films